Rebel Liesel is a 1920 German silent film directed by Erich Schönfelder and starring Ossi Oswalda. The film's sets were designed by the art director Kurt Richter.

Cast
In alphabetical order
Josefine Dora as Lore
Guido Herzfeld
Victor Janson as village policeman Bullrich
Bruno Kretschmar as mayor Kraft
Ossi Oswalda as Liesel
Albert Paulig
Charles Puffy as Ammenvermittler Rund
Julia Serda
Hermann Thimig as Theodor

References

External links

1920 films
Films of the Weimar Republic
Films directed by Erich Schönfelder
German silent feature films
German black-and-white films
UFA GmbH films